In enzymology, a diphosphate-glycerol phosphotransferase is an enzyme that catalyzes the chemical reaction

diphosphate + glycerol  phosphate + glycerol 1-phosphate

Thus, the two substrates of this enzyme are diphosphate and glycerol, whereas its two products are phosphate and glycerol 1-phosphate.

This enzyme belongs to the family of transferases, specifically those transferring phosphorus-containing groups (phosphotransferases) with an alcohol group as acceptor.  The systematic name of this enzyme class is diphosphate:glycerol 1-phosphotransferase. Other names in common use include PPi-glycerol phosphotransferase, and pyrophosphate-glycerol phosphotransferase.

References 

 

EC 2.7.1
Enzymes of unknown structure